The J. Mack Robinson College of Business Administration Building is a 14-story highrise at the corner of Broad and Marietta streets in the Fairlie-Poplar district of downtown Atlanta, which houses the business school of Georgia State University.  When completed in 1901 as the Empire Building, it was the first steel-frame structure and the tallest in the city, until surpassed by the Candler Building in 1906.

Morgan & Dillon and Hentz, Adler & Shutze were architects.  In 1972, while named the Citizens & Southern National Bank Building, the structure was added to the National Register of Historic Places.

The ground floor houses a full-service Bank of America branch. NationsBank purchased Citizens & Southern National Bank in 1991, and after later acquiring BankAmerica Corp., it, along with its branches, was renamed Bank of America.

The building doubled as the Illinois First Federal Savings & Loan association building in the 2016 film The Founder, a biopic of Ray Kroc starring Michael Keaton.

See also
 Citizens & Southern National Bank
 J. Mack Robinson College of Business

References

External links

 Robinson College of Business official website

Commercial buildings completed in 1901
Neoclassical architecture in Georgia (U.S. state)
Skyscraper office buildings in Atlanta
Georgia State University
Morgan & Dillon buildings
National Register of Historic Places in Atlanta
Bank buildings on the National Register of Historic Places in Georgia (U.S. state)
Hentz, Reid & Adler buildings
City of Atlanta-designated historic sites